Garfield Park, Chicago may refer to:

East Garfield Park, Chicago, a City of Chicago community area
West Garfield Park, Chicago, a City of Chicago community area
Garfield Park (Chicago park), a park in the East Garfield Park neighborhood of Chicago known for its conservatory